The Great Divide is a 1915 silent film drama produced by the Lubin Manufacturing Company and  starring Ethel Clayton. It is based on the 1906 stage play, The Great Divide, by William Vaughn Moody.

A print exists in the British Film Institute(BFI).

Cast
Ethel Clayton - Ruth Jordan
House Peters - Stephen Ghent
Marie Sterling - Mrs. Jordan
Hayden Stevenson - Phil Jordan
Mary Moore - Phil Jordan's Wife
Warner Richmond - Dr. Newberry
Fred O'Beck - Dutch (*as Ferdinand O'Beck)
Ray Chamberlin - Pedro

References

External links

1915 films
American silent feature films
American films based on plays
1915 drama films
Silent American drama films
Lubin Manufacturing Company films
American black-and-white films
Films directed by Edgar Lewis
1910s American films